Antonio Maspes (14 January 1932 – 19 October 2000) was an Italian world champion sprinter cyclist. Maspes was born and died in Milan. Maspes won seven professional world championship sprint titles between 1955 and 1964. He competed in the men's tandem event at the 1952 Summer Olympics, winning a bronze medal. Maspes also had a record five consecutive titles in the Grand Prix de Paris (1960-1964).

After his death, the Velodromo Vigorelli in Milano, where Maspes began with racing competitions, was renamed into Velodromo Maspes-Vigorelli.

Palmarès 

 1948
 1st, Coppa Caldirola
 1949
 1st, Sprint, National championship
 1952
 1st, Sprint, National championship
 3rd, Tandem,
 1953
 1st, Sprint, National championship
 1954
 3rd, GP de Paris, Sprint
 1st, Sprint, National championship
 1955
 1st, World championship, professional sprint, Milan
 1956
 3rd, GP de Paris
 1st, Sprint, National championship
 1st, World championship, professional sprint, Copenhagen
 1957
 1st, Sprint, National championship
 1958
 3rd, World championship, professional sprint, Paris
 1959
 1st, Sprint, National championship
 1st, World championship, professional sprint, Amsterdam
 1960
 1st, GP de Paris, Sprint
 1st, Sprint, National championship
 1st, World championship, professional sprint, Leipzig
 1961
 1st, GP de Paris, Sprint
 1st, Sprint, National championship
 1st, World championship, professional sprint, Zürich
 1962
 1st, GP de Paris, Sprint
 1st, Sprint, National championship
 1st, World championship, professional sprint, Milan
 1963
 1st, GP de Paris, Sprint
 1st, Sprint, National championship
 2nd, World championship, professional sprint, Rocourt
 1964
 1st, GP de Paris, Sprint
 1st, World championship, professional sprint, Paris
 2nd, Sprint, National championship
 1965
 1st, Sprint, National championship

See also
 Legends of Italian sport - Walk of Fame

References

External links 
 
 
 
 
 

1932 births
2000 deaths
Cyclists at the 1952 Summer Olympics
Italian male cyclists
Olympic bronze medalists for Italy
Olympic cyclists of Italy
UCI Track Cycling World Champions (men)
Cyclists from Milan
Olympic medalists in cycling
Medalists at the 1952 Summer Olympics
Italian track cyclists